Middlesex County is a county in the south central part of the U.S. state of Connecticut. As of the 2020 census, the population was 164,245. The county was created in May 1785 from portions of Hartford County and New London County.

Middlesex County is included in the Hartford-East Hartford-Middletown metropolitan statistical area known as Greater Hartford.

As with all eight of Connecticut's counties, there is now no county government and no county seat. In Connecticut, towns are responsible for all local government activities, including local police, fire and rescue, snow removal, and schools. In a few cases, neighboring towns will share certain resources, e.g. water, gas, etc. Counties in Connecticut serve merely as dividing lines for the state's judicial system.

Government
Middletown was the county seat of Middlesex County from its creation in 1785 until the elimination of county government in 1960. There is no government in Middlesex County other than the Middlesex County Judicial District. All county functions other than courts and county sheriff's departments were discontinued in 1960, and again in 2000 when the county sheriff's departments were reorganized as the Connecticut Judicial Marshal, due to political corruption in the county sheriff's departments. Joseph E. Bibisi was the last person to serve as high sheriff of Middlesex County.

Geography
It is the smallest county in Connecticut by land area and second-smallest by total area.

The terrain trends from mostly level along the Connecticut River and Atlantic coast to gently rolling uplands away from them.

Middlesex County is also the home of Wadsworth Falls.

Adjacent counties
Hartford County (north)
New London County (east)
New Haven County (west)
Suffolk County, New York (south)

National protected areas
 Silvio O. Conte National Wildlife Refuge (part)
 Stewart B. McKinney National Wildlife Refuge (part)

Demographics

2000 census
As of the census of 2000, there were 155,071 people, 61,341 households, and 40,607 families living in the county. There were 67,285 housing units at an average density of 182 per square mile (70/km2). According to the Census of 2010, the racial makeup of the county was 89.22% White, 4.64% Black or African American, 0.17% Native American, 2.56% Asian, 0.04% Pacific Islander, 1.30% from other races, and 2.06% from two or more races.  4.73% of the population were Hispanic or Latino of any race. 20.4% were of Italian, 14.3% Irish, 11.1% English, 8.9% Polish and 8.2% German ancestry. 91.1% spoke English, 2.6% Spanish, 1.9% Italian, 1.2% French and 1.0% Polish as their first language.

There were 61,341 households, out of which 30.30% had children under the age of 18 living with them, 54.40% were married couples living together, 8.80% had a female householder with no husband present, and 33.80% were non-families. 27.20% of all households were made up of individuals, and 10.00% had someone living alone who was 65 years of age or older.  The average household size was 2.43 and the average family size was 2.98.

In the county, the population was spread out, with 23.20% under the age of 18, 7.30% from 18 to 24, 31.10% from 25 to 44, 24.80% from 45 to 64, and 13.60% who were 65 years of age or older.  The median age was 39 years. For every 100 females, there were 95.10 males.  For every 100 females age 18 and over, there were 92.10 males.

The median income for a household in the county was $59,175, and the median income for a family was $71,319. Males had a median income of $48,341 versus $35,607 for females. The per capita income for the county was $28,251.  About 2.30% of families and 4.60% of the population were below the poverty line, including 4.00% of those under age 18 and 5.90% of those age 65 or over.

2010 census
As of the 2010 United States census, there were 165,676 people, 67,202 households, and 43,743 families living in the county. The racial makeup of the county was 89.2% white, 4.7% black or African American, 2.6% Asian, 0.2% American Indian, 1.3% from other races, and 2.1% from two or more races. Those of Hispanic or Latino origin made up 4.7% of the population. In terms of ancestry, 24.6% were Italian, 21.2% were Irish, 14.0% were English, 13.5% were German, 11.1% were Polish, and 3.4% were American.

Of the 67,202 households, 29.4% had children under the age of 18 living with them, 51.9% were married couples living together, 9.4% had a female householder with no husband present, 34.9% were non-families, and 28.2% of all households were made up of individuals. The average household size was 2.39 and the average family size was 2.95. The median age was 43.1 years.

The median income for a household in the county was $74,906 and the median income for a family was $91,589. Males had a median income of $62,031 versus $50,031 for females. The per capita income for the county was $37,519. About 3.0% of families and 6.1% of the population were below the poverty line, including 6.7% of those under age 18 and 4.3% of those age 65 or over.

Demographic breakdown by town

Income

Data is from the 2010 United States Census and the 2006-2010 American Community Survey 5-Year Estimates.

Race
Data is from the 2007-2011 American Community Survey 5-Year Estimates, ACS Demographic and Housing Estimates, "Race alone or in combination with one or more other races."

Communities

City
Middletown

Towns
Villages are named localities within towns, but have no separate corporate existence from the towns they are in.

Chester
Chester Center
Clinton
Clinton village
Cromwell
Deep River
Deep River Center
Winthrop
Durham
Durham village
East Haddam
Leesville
Millington
Moodus
East Hampton
Cobalt
East Hampton village
Lake Pocotopaug
Middle Haddam
Essex
Centerbrook
Essex Village
Ivoryton
Haddam
Hidden Lake
Higganum
Killingworth
Middlefield
Rockfall
Old Saybrook
Fenwick
Old Saybrook Center
Saybrook Manor
Portland
Portland village
Westbrook
Westbrook Center

Politics

|}

See also

National Register of Historic Places listings in Middlesex County, Connecticut

References

External links
Middlesex County Historical Society

 

 
1785 establishments in Connecticut
1960 disestablishments in Connecticut
Populated places established in 1785
Greater Hartford